Kim Mi-jung (born August 1, 1978) is a retired female South Korean judoka.

At the 2004 Summer Olympics she competed in the middleweight-class, losing in the first round to Belgian Catherine Jacques.

References 
 Sports references

Olympic judoka of South Korea
1978 births
Living people
South Korean female judoka
Judoka at the 2004 Summer Olympics
South Korean Buddhists